College of Applied Science may refer to:

Schools in India
 College of Applied Science (IHRD), 42 institutions under the supervision of the Institute of Human Resources Development in Kerala, India, including:
 College of Applied Science, Dhanuvachapuram
 College of Applied Science, Kattappana
 College of Applied Science, Nadapuram, affiliated with Calicut University
 College of Applied Science, Thiruvambady
 College of Applied Science, Thamarassery, in Korangad, Kozhikode district
 College of Applied Science, Vadakkencherry
 College of Applied Sciences, Adoor, affiliated with Kerala University
 Bhaskraycharya College of Applied Sciences, affiliated with the University of Delhi, India
 Waljat Colleges of Applied Sciences, in partnership with the Birla Institute of Technology (BIT, Mesra), India

Elsewhere
 Colleges of Applied Sciences, Oman, six government-run MoHE colleges in Oman
 University College of Applied Sciences (UCAS), Gaza, Palestine
 University of Cincinnati College of Applied Science, Ohio

See also 
College of Applied Science and Technology (disambiguation)
University of Applied Sciences
School of Applied Sciences